It's a Beautiful Day (クソすばらしいこの世界) is a 2013 Japanese horror film directed by Kayoko Asakura. It stars Kim Kkot-bi. It is the debut film by Kayoko Asakura and had its premiere at the Yubari Film Festival in 2013. The film is set in California, where A-jung (Kim Kkot-bi) is picked up by her Japanese friend Takako (Amagi Chika). They visit Takako's friends who treat A-jung poorly. That night around a campfire, mysterious supernatural events begin to happen involving Takako's friends.

Release
It's a Beautiful Day premiered at the Yubari Film Festival on February 22, 2013. It received theatrical release in Japan on June 8, 2013.

Reception
Derek Elley of Film Business Asia gave the film a seven out of ten rating, noting that the film is "restrained, with no fountains of blood and few flying bodyparts" and that "the film deliriously pushes the borders of the genre"

Notes

External links
 

2013 horror films
Japanese horror films
American supernatural horror films
2013 films
2010s American films
2010s Japanese films